Mia Taumoepeau is a New Zealand based actress.

Career
In 2000, Taumoepeau secured a role in film Hopeless as Maryann Moore. Taumoepeau then starred in the sci-fi drama series The Tribe in which she portrayed the character of Ginny. She later reprised the role of Maryann in a television series spin-off titled Lovebites.

Filmography

References

External links 

Living people
New Zealand television actresses
Year of birth missing (living people)